Robert Kroll (born 30 December 1972) is a German former professional tennis player.

Born in Bucholz, a town near Hamburg, Kroll played Bundesliga tennis for Rot-Weiß Hagen and competed briefly on the professional tour in the early 1990s.

Kroll had a career high singles ranking of 441 in the world, with ATP Tour main draw appearances at the 1993 Vienna Open and 1994 German Open (Hamburg), both times as a qualifier.

A former training partner of Martina Hingis, Kroll now runs a laser therapy practice in Hamburg, specialising in the treatment of tinnitus.

References

External links
 
 

1972 births
Living people
German male tennis players
Tennis players from Hamburg
People from Harburg (district)